Zvončín is a village and municipality of Trnava District in the Trnava region of Slovakia.

References

External links
Official website
http://en.e-obce.sk/obec/zvoncin/zvoncin.html
https://web.archive.org/web/20070427022352/http://www.statistics.sk/mosmis/eng/run.html 

Villages and municipalities in Trnava District